The Kupa is a river in Croatia and Slovenia.

Kupa may also refer to:
The Kupa (Lėvuo), a river in Lithuania
The Kupa (Kuta), a river in Siberian Russia
Kupa, Hungary, a village
Kupa Synagogue, located in Kraków, Poland
Kupa language, a language of Nigeria
KUPA, a call sign held from 2004 to 2020 by a radio station now called KHXM (1370 AM), licensed to serve Pearl City, Hawaii, United States
Mihály Kupa (born 1941), Hungarian politician
Litsea garciae, a tree native to Southeast Asia locally called kupa
 Kupa, Croatia, a village near Delnice

See also
Magyar Kupa (disambiguation), several Hungarian sports competitions
Koopa (disambiguation)
Kuppa (disambiguation)